Giannis Christopoulos (born 22 June 2000) is a Greek professional footballer who plays as a centre-back for Croatian club Slaven Belupo, on loan from Asteras Tripolis.

Career
The 20-year-old defender, who is a product of Asteras Tripolis' academies, had 10 appearances with the club in the 2020–21 season, and is expected to solve his contract. According to reports from Belgium, Beerschot could be the next club in his career, as the Greek central defender is expected to replace Denis Prychynenko who will leave the club.

On 5 July 2021, Asteras Tripolis announced the extension of his contract until 2024.

Career statistics

Club

References

External links

Giannis Christopoulos at AsterasTripolis.gr

2000 births
Living people
Greek footballers
Greek expatriate footballers
Expatriate footballers in Croatia
Greek expatriate sportspeople in Croatia
Greece youth international footballers
Super League Greece players
Croatian Football League players
Asteras Tripolis F.C. players
NK Slaven Belupo players
Association football defenders
Footballers from Patras